In animal breeding, a breeding mount or phantom mount is an imitation of a female animal used to hold an artificial vagina for collecting semen from a male animal for use in artificial insemination. In use, the male animal is encouraged to mount the breeding mount as if he were copulating with a female. Breeding mounts are commonly used in conjunction with a real female of the same species nearby, to bring the male to full sexual arousal so that he is ready to mount the breeding mount. In the case of horses, this is known as the "tease mare".

References

See also 
 Reproductive technology

Animal breeding
Livestock
Artificial insemination